The Masked Lover is a 1940 Czechoslovak historical drama film directed by Otakar Vávra. It is based on a novel by Honoré de Balzac.

Cast
 Lída Baarová as Lenka Rossetiová
 Ewald Balser
 Josef Belský as Judge
 Rudolf Deyl
 Gustav Nezval as Leon z Costy
 Ladislav Pešek as Leonuv sluha
 Jirí Steimar as Albert Angely
 Jiřina Steimarová as Emilie

References

External links
 

1940 films
1940 drama films
1940s historical drama films
Czech historical drama films
1940s Czech-language films
Czechoslovak black-and-white films
Films based on works by Honoré de Balzac
Films directed by Otakar Vávra
Films set in the 19th century
1940s Czech films